John Johannesen Frederiksen (born 10 January 1996) is a Faroese professional footballer who plays as a forward, most recently for Scottish club Raith Rovers. Born in Denmark, he represents Faroe Islands internationally.

Club career
At the age of 15, Frederiksen auditioned for Danish television show Drengedrømmen. As a youth player, he joined the youth academy of FCK, one of Denmark's most successful clubs.

Frederiksen started his career with Danish fourth division side Bornholm. After that, he signed for Fredensborg in the Danish third division. In 2017, Frederiksen signed for Faroese team 07 Vestur. Before the second half of 2018–19, he signed for Frem in Denmark. In 2020, Frederiksen signed for Finnish outfit MuSa after trialing in Slovakia and receiving offers from Belarus, Romania, Tunisia, and Turkey. On 25 July 2020, he debuted for MuSa during a 5-1 win over Gnistan, scoring 3 goals. 

In 2021, he was diagnosed with a brain tumor. After that, Frederiksen signed for SKU Amstetten in Austria. On 23 July 2021, Frederiksen debuted for SKU Amstetten during a 1–1 draw with FAC. On October 7th 2022, Raith Rovers announced the signing of Frederiksen on a short term deal. Frederiksen would score his first goal for Raith in a Scottish Challenge Cup win over Queen's Park. Frederiksen would leave Raith by mutual consent on 31 January 2023.

International career
He made his debut for the Faroe Islands national football team on 4 September 2021 in a World Cup qualifier against Denmark, a 0–1 home loss. He substituted Jóan Símun Edmundsson in the 90th minute.

References

External links
 John Frederiksen at playmakerstats.com
 

1996 births
People from Bornholm
Living people
Faroese footballers
Faroe Islands youth international footballers
Faroe Islands international footballers
Association football forwards
Fredensborg BI players
07 Vestur players
Havnar Bóltfelag players
Boldklubben Frem players
Skovshoved IF players
Musan Salama players
SKU Amstetten players
Danish 2nd Division players
Faroe Islands Premier League players
Ykkönen players
2. Liga (Austria) players
Danish men's footballers
Danish expatriate men's footballers
Faroese expatriate footballers
Expatriate footballers in Finland
Expatriate footballers in Austria
Danish expatriate sportspeople in Finland
Danish expatriate sportspeople in Austria
Sportspeople from the Capital Region of Denmark
Raith Rovers F.C. players
Danish expatriate sportspeople in Scotland
Expatriate footballers in Scotland